And Then It Happened is a Canadian children's book series by Michael Wade and Laura Wade. The first book was released in 2003. The series has 14 books.

Main characters
Gordon: He is the one who usually lands the other boys in trouble and good pranks.
Paulo: He is comfortable with using a variety of tools and lives on a farm with his parents.
Micheal: He is the storyteller of the series.

Supporting characters
Mrs. Hoagsbrith: Teacher of the three boys at Danglemore Public School.
Mr. Evans: Principal of Danglemore Public School.
Mr. Butterworth: A neighbour of the narrator. 
Mr. Smith: Gordon's dad.
Uncle Ivan: Gordons uncle
Aunt Jenifer: Gordon's aunt and Uncle Ivan's wife.
Mr. Lima : Paulo's dad.
Mrs. Lima: Paulo's mom.

References

Canadian children's novels
Series of children's books